Halica: Bliss Out v.11, often referred to as just Halica is the debut album from experimental pop group Sweet Trip, and was released by Darla Records in November 1998. It was the eleventh entry in the label's Bliss Out series of ambient-style records.

Background 
In Sweet Trip's early years as a three piece, the band initially started out as a "traditional guitar, bass, and drums" group, albeit struggling to find a bass player for the songs they were writing. During this period, they created many 4-track recordings, with the songs containing many elements of pop, rock, electronic and ambient. Five of these tracks were printed onto cassette tapes and sent to several indie labels, one of which was Darla Records. According to Valerie Cooper, they were one of the first labels to show genuine interest in their work, and so the band signed on with them; songs from the cassette would eventually be part of their debut's track list.

The cover artwork notably features a silvery cloud-like background, which according to the release for the expanded edition is an edited photo of ecstasy pills given to the band's designer by at-the-time member Viet Le. Also on the cover is a depiction of a mushroom after the album's title, which according to Burgos is an in-joke based on a "pretty wild mop-top" hairstyle he had at the time that Le would make fun of.

Track listing
Track list adapted from CD version.

Notes 
1.The names of these two tracks are switched, which was rectified for later digital releases.

Halica: Bliss Out, v.11 (Expanded Edition) 

In January 2022, a re-release of the album was announced, with a reorganised and expanded track list. This version of the album combines the original release with tracks from the 1998 EP Fish Remixes & Versions, alongside two additional tracks only featured on Little Darla compilations.

Digital track listing 
Track list adapted from Darla Records.

References 

Sweet Trip albums
1999 debut albums